The Day of the Dissonance is a 1984 fantasy novel by American writer Alan Dean Foster. The book follows the continuing adventures of Jonathan Thomas Meriweather who is transported from our world into a land of talking animals and magic. It is the third book in the Spellsinger series.

Plot
Jon-Tom, with the somewhat faithful otter Mudge, sets across the Glittergeist Ocean in his strange new world in order to find a magical cure for the dying wizard Clothahump. Along the way he conjures up Roseroar, an Amazonian tiger, rescues Jalwar, the ferret, and together they free Folly, a not so innocent beauty, from bondage. Jon-Tom and his motley crew press on, confronting a forest of Fungoid Frankensteins on the Muddletop Moors, a parrot pirate on the high seas, cannibal fairies in the enchanted canyon, and the evil wizard of Malderpot. They also ally with a shopkeep with a secret and a golden unicorn with his own.

External links

Alan Dean Foster homepage

1984 American novels
American fantasy novels
Novels by Alan Dean Foster
Spellsinger series